Kambel or Kambal may refer to:
 Kambel Balad
 Kambel Dal Morad
 Kambel Karim Bakhsh
 Kambel Mohammad Azim
 Kambel-e Soleyman
 Kambel-e Soleyman Rural District
 Zunft zum Kämbel, a medieval Swiss guild